In mathematics, an affine combination of   is a linear combination
 
such that 

The elements  can also be points of a Euclidean space, and, more generally, of an affine space over a field . See  for the definition in this case.

This concept is fundamental in Euclidean geometry and affine geometry, because the set of all affine combinations of a set of points forms the smallest subspace containing the points, exactly as the linear combinations of a set of vectors form their linear span.

The affine combinations commute with any affine transformation  in the sense that

See also

Related combinations

Convex combination
Conical combination
Linear combination

Affine geometry
 Affine space
 Affine geometry
 Affine hull

References
 . See chapter 2.

External links 
 Notes on affine combinations.

Affine geometry